South Passage is a 14 kilometre (9 mi) wide strait that separates the outlying North Island from other islands in the Wallabi Group of the Houtman Abrolhos island chain, in the Indian Ocean off the coast of Western Australia.

References

North Island (Houtman Abrolhos)
Wallabi Group
Straits of Australia